William Alexander Lindsay  (8 June 1846 – 13 September 1926) was a long-serving officer of arms at the College of Arms in London. Lindsay was the son of Hon. Colin Lindsay son of James 7th Earl of Balcarres, 24th Earl of Crawford and Lady Frances Howard, daughter of the Earl of Wicklow. On 7 May 1870, he married Lady Harriet Hamilton-Gordon, a daughter of the 5th Earl of Aberdeen and Mary Baillie.  His heraldic career began in 1882 when he was appointed Portcullis Pursuivant in Ordinary at the College of Arms. He was promoted to the office of Windsor Herald of Arms in Ordinary in 1894. In 1919, he was promoted Norroy King of Arms after Charles Athill was promoted to Clarenceux King of Arms. Three years later, Lindsay followed Athill to the role of Clarenceux on Athill's death.  Lindsay held the office from 1922 until his own death in 1926.

Arms

See also
King of Arms
Herald
Pursuivant

References

External links

The College of Arms
CUHAGS Officer of Arms Index

English officers of arms
Commanders of the Royal Victorian Order
British genealogists
1846 births
1926 deaths